Franz Siegl (born August 4, 1955 in Innsbruck, Tyrol) is an Austrian bobsledder who competed during the 1980s. He won a silver medal in the four-man event at the 1986 FIBT World Championships in Königssee.

Competing in two Winter Olympics, Siegl earned his best finish of sixth in the four-man event at Calgary in 1988.

References
1984 bobsleigh four-man results
1988 bobsleigh four-man results
Bobsleigh four-man world championship medalists since 1930

1955 births
Living people
Austrian male bobsledders
Bobsledders at the 1984 Winter Olympics
Bobsledders at the 1988 Winter Olympics
Sportspeople from Innsbruck
Olympic bobsledders of Austria